"Human Touch" is a 1983 single performed by Australian musician Rick Springfield from his album Living in Oz. The song reached number 18 on the Billboard Hot 100 in the U.S. It was also his most successful hit in the UK, peaking at number 23; this also led to a performance on Top of the Pops. Because of this being Springfield's only top 40 single in the UK, he is considered a one-hit wonder in England, despite the fact that "Jessie's Girl" is his biggest hit worldwide. However, that song only peaked at 43 in 1984 for Springfield, 3 years after its release in the UK.

Cash Box noted the irony of the song using synthesizers and drum machines in a song that rails "against the impersonal coldness of computerized society," saying that this works "quite well."

Some of the music video is about Marvel characters like Captain Marvel (Mar-Vell) and Nova Corps.

The song features in the videogame Grand Theft Auto: Vice City Stories on the fictional radio station Flash FM.

References

External links
 Lyrics of this song

Rick Springfield songs
1983 songs
1983 singles
Songs written by Rick Springfield
RCA Records singles